Twin Dragon, twinned-dragons, Dragon twins, or variation, may refer to:

 Twin Dragons (1992 film), Hong Kong action comedy
 twindragon (fractal), a mathematical fractal pattern
 Shadow Warrior: Twin Dragon (1998 videogame), a 1998 expansion pack for the 1997 game Shadow Warrior

See also

 Dragon (disambiguation)